Khao soi or khao soy is a dish developed by Muslim Chin Haw people (Chinese immigrants from Yunnan province in southwest China) served in Laos and northern Thailand. A comparable dish, ohn no khao swè, is widely served in Myanmar. The name means 'cut rice', although it is possible that it is simply a corruption of the Burmese word for noodles – "khao swè" – which may account for the variations. Traditionally, the dough for the rice noodles is spread out on a cloth stretched over boiling water. After steaming the large sheet noodle is then rolled and cut with scissors. Lao khao soi is traditionally made with hand sliced rice noodles in clear soup broth and topped with minced pork. In some markets in Luang Namtha and Muang Sing vendors still hand cut the noodles. These traditionally cut noodles can also be found in several places in northern Thailand.

Versions
There are two common versions of khao soi:

Lao khao soi is completely different and has no relation to the more famous Muslim influenced khao soi, a rich coconut curry and egg rice noodle soup, of northern Thailand and Burma. Lao khao soi is a hand sliced rice noodle soup with clear chicken, beef or pork broth topped with a tomato meat sauce made of minced pork, tomatoes, garlic and fermented bean paste. The dish is always served with a fresh herbs. Lao khao soi noodles are made with steamed rectangular sheets of rice flour batter, the streamed rice flour sheets are then rolled and sliced into wide rice noodle ribbons. The name khao soi is derived from the Lao language meaning 'sliced rice': khao is “rice” and soi means “sliced” and it is probably where the dish got its name. The northern Lao provinces of Luang Namtha and Luang Prabang is said to be the birthplace of the Lao khao soi.  Northern Laotians have a special way of preparing this dish, different versions of it can be found at Lao restaurants. Northern Thai khao soi or Khao Soi Islam is closer to the present day Burmese ohn no khao swè, being a soup-like dish made with a mix of deep-fried crispy egg noodles and boiled egg noodles, pickled mustard greens, shallots, lime, ground chillies fried in oil, and meat in a curry-like sauce containing coconut milk. The curry is somewhat similar to that of yellow or massaman curry but of a thinner consistency. It is popular as a street dish eaten by Thai people in northern Thailand, though not frequently served in Thai restaurants abroad.There is some reason to believe that the Thai version of khao soi was influenced by Chinese Muslim cuisine and was therefore likely served with chicken or beef.Different variants of khao soi that are made without any coconut milk and with rice noodles instead of egg noodles are mainly eaten in the eastern half of northern Thailand.
Khao soi is featured in the cuisine of the Shan people who primarily live in Burma. This version of khao soi, as well as the version in Chiang Rai Province, can contain pieces of curdled blood (see khow suey).

Gallery

See also 
 Khow suey
 Laksa
 List of soups
 Ohn no khao swè
 Thai curry

Notes and references

External links
 
 Khao soi recipe, Northern Thai style curried noodle soup with chicken

Northern Thai cuisine
Laotian soups
Burmese cuisine
Southeast Asian curries
Noodle soups
Laotian noodle dishes
Thai noodle dishes
Chiang Mai